Mel Krantzler (1920 – October 31, 2011) was an American psychologist best known for his popular 1974 book, Creative Divorce, which remained on The New York Times Bestseller List for a year and sold three million copies. He also wrote Learning to Love Again and Creative Marriage.

References

1920 births
2011 deaths
People from Queens, New York
Deaths from cancer in California
20th-century American psychologists